University of Ss. Cyril and Methodius in Trnava (Slovak: Univerzita sv. Cyrila a Metoda v Trnave) is a public university located in Trnava, Slovakia. Established by Law No. 201/1997 Z.z. from 27 June 1997. Since 2018, Roman Boča has been the rector of the university.

Faculties  
University of Ss. Cyril and Methodius in Trnava has five faculties: 
 Faculty of Arts 
 Faculty of Mass Media Communication
 Faculty of Natural Science 
 Faculty of Social Science 
 Institute of Physiotherapy, Balneology and Medical Rehabilitation (in Piešťany)

Rector  
The Academic Senate of the University of Ss. Cyril and Methodius in Trnava on 13 March 2018 elected a new rector of the university, Roman Boča.

References

External links  
 Official website

Universities in Slovakia
Trnava
Education in Slovakia